HGTV is a Canadian English-language Category A cable and satellite specialty channel owned as a joint venture between Corus Entertainment (which serves as managing partner and owns 80.24% majority control through licensee HGTV Canada, Inc.) and Warner Bros. Discovery (which owns the remaining 19.76%). HGTV broadcasts programs relating to real estate, home and garden design, and renovations.

The network's programming draws partially from the U.S. version of the channel, but it also carries original Canadian-produced series, some of which have in turn also been picked up for broadcast by the U.S. network or others internationally, as well as a smaller selection of home renovation programming acquired from other channels in the United States or the United Kingdom.

History
In September 1996, Your Channel Television Inc., a company majority owned by Atlantis Communications with minority partner E. W. Scripps Company, was granted a television broadcasting licence by the Canadian Radio-television and Telecommunications Commission (CRTC) for a channel called HGTV-TV Canada, described at the time as broadcasting "programming that presents practical, hands-on advice and instruction about homes and gardens. The programming will revolve around five key themes: building and remodelling, decorating and interior design, gardening and landscaping, crafts and hobbies and special interests."

The channel was launched as HGTV on October 17, 1997. Channels also launched that day were History Television, Teletoon, and Prime, just to name a few. In June 1998, Atlantis Communications announced that it planned to merge with Alliance Communications, another fellow television and film producer and broadcaster, owners of History Television and Showcase at the time, to form a new company called Alliance Atlantis Communications. The CRTC approved the merger in May 1999.

On January 18, 2008, a joint venture between Canwest and Goldman Sachs Capital Partners known as CW Media acquired control of HGTV through its purchase of Alliance Atlantis' broadcasting assets, which were placed in a trust in August 2007.

On October 27, 2010, the channel's ownership changed again as Shaw Communications gained control of HGTV as a result of its acquisition of Canwest and Goldman Sachs' interest in CW Media.

A high definition feed launched on January 31, 2011. It is available through all major television providers.

On April 1, 2016, Shaw Media was sold to Corus Entertainment. This gave HGTV some new sister channels throughout its lifespan.

Programming

Noted personalities who have been featured in HGTV Canada programming have included Mike Holmes, Drew and Jonathan Scott, Bryan Baeumler, Chris Hyndman and Steven Sabados, Sarah Richardson, Sebastian Clovis, Scott McGillivray, Samantha Pynn, and Damon Bennett, among others.

Some of its original Canadian-produced series have also been acquired by the U.S. version of the network; in particular, Property Brothers has been among the U.S. version's top programs.

References

External links
 

Analog cable television networks in Canada
Corus Entertainment networks
English-language television stations in Canada
Canada
Television channels and stations established in 1997
1997 establishments in Canada